Mary Alice "Peggy" Butts (August 15, 1924 – March 6, 2004) was a Canadian politician who represented Nova Scotia in the Senate from 1997 to 1999.

Early life and education
Born in Glace Bay, Nova Scotia, on the Feast of the Assumption, Peggy was a Roman Catholic religious sister in the Sisters of Notre Dame congregation. She obtained several degrees, including two bachelor's degrees in philosophy and education, a master's degree in political philosophy from the University of Ottawa, and a PhD in political philosophy from the University of Toronto. Through her life she served as a schoolteacher and high school principal. Later she was a professor at St. Francis Xavier University and the University College of Cape Breton (now Cape Breton University).

Political career 
At the age of 73, Peggy was appointed to the Senate. However, qualification laws for senators caused problems with her appointment. All Canadian senators are required to possess land worth at least $4,000 in the province for which he or she is appointed, as well as own real and personal property worth at least $4,000, above his or her debts and liabilities. Having taken a vow of poverty upon becoming a nun, Butts was able to officially be sworn in only after her order formally transferred a small parcel of land to her name. Butts resigned at the age of 75 as required by law, and for her two years of service donated her entire salary to charity.

Personal life
She had a strong influence on her nephew Gerald Butts, principal secretary to both Ontario Premier Dalton McGuinty and Canadian prime minister Justin Trudeau.

Peggy Butts died at age 79 in 2004.

Awards
Butts received the Weiler Award in 1995 in recognition of her contributions to community and social development in Canada, and was awarded an honorary degree from St. Francis Xavier University in 1996.

She received the Queen Elizabeth II Golden Jubilee Medal in 2002.

References

External links
 

1924 births
2004 deaths
Academic staff of St. Francis Xavier University
Canadian schoolteachers
20th-century Canadian nuns
Women members of the Senate of Canada
Canadian senators from Nova Scotia
Liberal Party of Canada senators
People from Glace Bay
Sisters of Notre Dame de Namur
St. Francis Xavier University alumni
University of Ottawa alumni
University of Toronto alumni
Women in Nova Scotia politics
20th-century Canadian women politicians
Academic staff of Cape Breton University